Jorge González may refer to:

Arts
 Jorge González (musician) (born 1964), lead singer of Chilean rock group Los Prisioneros
Jorge González (album), his self-titled solo album (1993)
 Jorge González (singer) (born 1988), Spanish singer
 Jorge González Camarena (1908–1980), Mexican muralist, painter and sculptor
 Jorge Gonzalez, better known as Siddhartha (musician), is a soloist rock musician

Politics
 Jorge González Otero (born 1957), Puerto Rican politician and mayor of Jayuya
 Jorge González Torres (born 1942), Mexican politician
 Jorge Emilio González Martínez (born 1972), Mexican politician
 Jorge González von Marées (1900–1962), Chilean political figure and author
 Jorge Soler González (born 1975), Spanish politician

Sports
 Jorge González (athlete) (born 1952), Puerto Rican marathon runner
 Jorge González (Spanish athlete) (born 1945), Spanish Olympic athlete
 , Puerto Rican beach volleyball player
 , Colombian volleyball player
 Jorge González, known as Mágico González (born 1958), Salvadoran football (soccer) player
 Jorge González Díaz, known as Yordi (born 1974), Spanish football (soccer) player
 Jorge González (wrestler) (1966–2010), professional basketball player and wrestler known as "Giant González" and "El Gigante"
 Jorge Luis González (born 1964), Cuban former heavyweight boxer
 Jorge González (referee), Major League Soccer (MLS) referee 
 Jorge González (chess player), Colombian chess player, see Colombian Chess Championship
 Jorge González (sport shooter) (born 1957), Spanish Olympic sport shooter
 Jorge González (football manager), manager of Uruguayan football club C.A. Cerro
 Jorge González (swimmer) (born 1949), Puerto Rican swimmer
 Jorge González (Argentine footballer) (born 1988), Argentine football striker
 Jorge González (Paraguayan footballer) (born 1988), Paraguayan football midfielder
 Jorge Gonzalez (footballer, born 1998), Spanish footballer